The International Athletic Meeting in Honor of Miner's Day is an annual track and field meet that takes place at Ob Jezeru City Stadium in Velenje, Slovenia. It was first held in 1995. The most recent edition took place in 2017.

Meeting records

Men

Women

References

External links
 Official website
 Meeting records

European Athletic Association meetings
Athletics competitions in Slovenia
Recurring sporting events established in 1995
1995 establishments in Slovenia